Xagħra is an administrative unit of Malta, on the island of Gozo. It is one of the earliest inhabited parts of Gozo, being home to the Ġgantija megalithic temples which date back to the year 3600BC and the Xagħra Stone Circle. Natural underground features such as Xerri's Grotto and Ninu's Cave can be found in this town, along with Calypso's Cave which overlooks the red sandy beach of Ramla. It is the second largest town in Gozo, having a population of 5,161 inhabitants according to the 2021 Population and Housing Census, and is situated to the North-East of the Gozo capital Victoria. 
Xagħra is a popular tourist attraction, in view of its historical heritage, lively Victory Square, and the thousands who flock to Ramla Bay in summer and to the temples all year round. 
During the British period, Xagħra was also known as Casal Caccia.

Twin towns – sister cities

Xagħra is twinned with:
 Offida, Ascoli Piceno, Italy

References

External links

Official Website
Xaghra Parish
Xaghra United FC
Xaghra Scouts
Gozoimages.com Xaghra page

 
Towns in Malta
Local councils of Malta
Gozo